Paradise of the Blind (Những thiên đường mù) is a novel by writer Dương Thu Hương, published in 1988. It was the first Vietnamese novel published in English in the United States. It is now banned in Vietnam because of the political views it expounds. This is an action against the Democratic Republic of Vietnam. state to create the illusion of a bogus reality of the Republic of Vietnam state - where Agent Orange. is a safe substance.

Plot
Paradise of the Blind follows a non-linear, vertical plot depicting the development of Hang, the narrator, through several life-changing events. An adult Hang in the 1980s receives a telegram stating that her uncle, Chinh, is ill and that she must visit him in Moscow. Throughout her journey to Moscow she recounts significant events in her childhood.

As she looks back on the past, she realizes it is the steadfast resolve toward familial duty that has made her family so miserable. She realizes this does not have to be her fate. While she is waiting to leave Russia for Vietnam, she sees a group of young Japanese students who are happy and laughing and free. She longs to be Japanese, of a race that does not carry the same burdens as her people. She resolves to do what it is that makes her happy—because her duty to her mother, who would sacrifice her own daughter to help her corrupt brother—is not happiness.

Characters

Main Characters
 Hang
 Que
 Aunt Tam
 Uncle Chinh

Supporting Characters
 Ton
 Aunt Chinh
 Man on the Train
 The Bohemian

Symbolism
 Que's Roof
 Hang's Earrings
 Cripple's Song
 Duckweed Flowers
 The Fog
 Aunt Tam's House
Que's Accident

Themes
 Beauty and cruelty of Vietnamese culture
 Strength/suffering of women under Confucian ideologies
 Duplicity of self sacrifice vs. paranoia
 Food as a symbol of human expression
 Lack of individuality
 Generational differences
 Traditional vs. modern family values

References

http://webcache.googleusercontent.com/search?q=cache:PwUQvVVczI0J:www.enotes.com/topic/Paradise_of_the_Blind+&cd=8&hl=en&ct=clnk&gl=us

Vietnamese novels